Linda Teuteberg (née Merschin; born 22 April 1981) is a German lawyer and politician of the Free Democratic Party (FDP). Serving as a member of the Bundestag since 2017, she was elected as General Secretary of the FDP on 26 April 2019 and thereby became part of the party's leadership around chairman Christian Lindner. Lindner asked for and received her resignation effective 19 September 2020.

Early life and education 
Teuteberg was born Linda Merschin on 22 April 1981 in Königs Wusterhausen, East Germany and grew up in Görsdorf bei Storkow, Storkow, Brandenburg as the daughter of a teacher and an engineer. She graduated from the Katholischen Gymnasium Bernhardinum in Fürstenwalde and, on a scholarship from the Studienstiftung, studied jurisprudence and economics at the University of Potsdam.

Political career 
Teuteberg joined the Young Liberals in 1998 and became a member of FDP in 2000.

Career in state politics
Teuteberg was elected to the Landtag of Brandenburg on 27 September 2009 on the state list and was supported by Hans-Dietrich Genscher. Teuteberg served for five years. She participated in the 2012 German presidential election on 18 March 2012.

During her time in the state parliament, Teuteberg served on the Committee on Legal Affairs, the Committee on the Election of Judges and the Enquete Commission on the "consequences of the SED dictatorship and the transition to a democratic constitutional state in the Land of Brandenburg", and was alao a deputy member of the budget, finance, economy, European affairs and development policy committees. She was also her parliamentary group's spokesperson for legal and media affairs. She did not seek re-election in 2014.

From 2014 until 2017, Teuteberg worked at the Federal Ministry of Education and Research.

Member of the German Bundestag, 2017–present
In an internal vote in November 2016, Teuteberg defeated  with 57% of votes to become the FDP lead candidate in Brandenburg for the 2017 German federal election. The FDP won 7.1% of the second votes (9.2% in Teuteberg's constituency) in Brandenburg. Teuteberg won 7.5% of the first votes.

Since September 2017, Teuteberg has been a member of the German Bundestag, where she serves on the Committee on Internal Affairs. She is also her parliamentary group's spokesperson on migration policy.

In the negotiations to form a so-called traffic light coalition of the Social Democratic Party (SPD), the Green Party and the FDP following the 2021 federal elections, Teuteberg was part of her party's delegation in the working group on migration and integration, co-chaired by Boris Pistorius, Luise Amtsberg and Joachim Stamp.

Other activities
 Federal Agency for Civic Education (BPB), Member of the Board of Trustees (since 2022)
 Ludwig Erhard Foundation, Member of the Board (since 2020)
 Bündnis für Demokratie und Toleranz, Member of the Advisory Board
 Federal Foundation for the Reappraisal of the SED Dictatorship, Member of the Board of Trustees
 Gegen Vergessen – Für Demokratie, Member of the Board  
 Karl Hamann Foundation, Member of the Board of Trustees
 Quadriga Hochschule Berlin, Member of the Advisory Board on Politics and Public Affairs
 Stephanus-Stiftung, Member of the Board of Trustees

Political positions
On the state level, the focus of Teuteberg's political work was the processing of the SED dictatorship and the reparation of the injustice caused in the GDR and the advocacy of a liberal economic policy. Teuteberg opposes the fact that municipal enterprises can compete with private companies and operate economically. Teuteberg campaigned for the University of Potsdam, which was to lose its law school according to plans of the Brandenburg state government.

Amid the emergence of the SARS-CoV-2 Omicron variant in Germany in late 2021, Teuteberg was one of 22 members of the FDP parliamentary group who advocated against the introduction of a COVID-19 vaccine mandate.

Personal life 
Teuteberg is married to Björn Teuteberg, a member of the Potsdam city council. She is a member of the Evangelical Church in Berlin, Brandenburg and Silesian Upper Lusatia.

References

External links 

 
 
 
 Biography from the Bundestag

1981 births
Members of the Landtag of Brandenburg
Members of the Bundestag for Brandenburg
Living people
Members of the Bundestag 2017–2021
Members of the Bundestag 2021–2025
Members of the Bundestag for the Free Democratic Party (Germany)